Galu Salar (also Romanized as Galū Sālār and Golūsālār; also known as Gulu Sālār and Kalū Sālār) is a village in Khenaman Rural District, in the Central District of Rafsanjan County, Kerman Province, Iran. At the 2006 census, its population was 131, in 46 families.

References 

Populated places in Rafsanjan County